"Das was wir sind" is the debut single from the album Diese Stadt, by the Austrian band Mondscheiner. It was released on 7 July 2006 and reached #10 on the Austrian charts.

Track list 
"Das was wir sind"
"Romeo und Julia"
"Tagebuch eines Dichters"
"Schön ist die Welt"

Chart performance

Weekly charts

Year-end charts

References 

2006 debut singles
Austrian rock songs
2006 songs
Sony BMG singles